Troublesome Creek is a stream in Lee and Scott counties, Virginia, in the United States. It is a tributary of the Clinch River.

Troublesome Creek was named by pioneers on the Wilderness Road.

See also
List of rivers of Virginia

References

Rivers of Lee County, Virginia
Rivers of Scott County, Virginia
Rivers of Virginia